The 2020 Pac-12 Football Championship Game (branded as the Pac-12 Football Championship Game presented by 76 for sponsorship reasons) was a college football game played on Friday, December 18, 2020, at Los Angeles Memorial Coliseum in Los Angeles, California, to determine the 2020 champion of the Pac-12 Conference. The game featured the North division's then second place Oregon and the South division champions USC, and is the conference's tenth championship game. Washington, the North division champion, was unable to participate due to having insufficient players available.

This game was originally to be held at Allegiant Stadium in Paradise, Nevada, as part of a new two-year deal. Due to the COVID-19 pandemic, the game was pulled from Las Vegas, and was instead hosted at the home stadium of USC.

Teams
The 2020 Pac–12 Football Championship Game featured the Oregon Ducks, then second place in the North Division, and the USC Trojans, South Division champions. Oregon and USC had met 61 times previously before this game, with USC holding a 38–21–1 advantage in the series. The two teams did not meet during the 2020 regular season.

Oregon

Oregon was selected to represent the North Division after division winner Washington did not have the minimum number of scholarship players available to participate in the game due to the COVID-19 pandemic. The week before, Washington had to cancel its game against Oregon for the same reason. This marks Oregon's fourth overall appearance in the Pac-12 championship game, having won in all three of their prior appearances. The Ducks are the defending Pac-12 champions, having defeated Utah in the 2019 title game. Oregon enters the contest with a 3–2 record.

USC

USC secured its spot in the game with its December 13 win over UCLA. This is USC's third appearance in the championship game, having last appeared the 2017 game. USC entered the game with an 5–0 record in the regular season and in Pac-12 play. The Trojans were designated as the home team, based on their better overall record.

Game summary

Statistics

See also
 List of Pac-12 Conference football champions

References

External links
 Game statistics at statbroadcast.com

Championship
Pac-12 Football Championship Game
Oregon Ducks football games
USC Trojans football games
Sports in Los Angeles
Pac-12 Football
Pac-12 Football